DeWitt Clinton Dominick (June 4, 1918 – September 9, 2009) was an American lawyer and politician from New York.

Life
He was born on June 4, 1918, in Newburgh, Orange County, New York, the son of D. Clinton Dominick (1889–1967) and Blanche H. Dominick (1890–1976). He attended the public schools and Newburgh Free Academy. He graduated from Virginia Military Institute. During World War II he served in the U.S. Army, and attained the rank of colonel. In 1944, he married Nancy Ragan (1922–1978), and they had five children. He graduated from Columbia Law School in 1948, was admitted to the bar, and practiced law in Newburgh.

Dominick was a member of the New York State Assembly (Orange Co., 1st D.) from 1955 to 1958, sitting in the 170th and 171st New York State Legislatures.

He was a member of the New York State Senate from 1959 to 1970, sitting in the 172nd, 173rd, 174th, 175th, 176th, 177th and 178th New York State Legislatures. He was a delegate to the New York State Constitutional Convention of 1967. In 1970, he co-sponsored the bill which legalized in the State of New York unrestricted abortion until 24 weeks of pregnancy. In June 1970, he ran for re-nomination, but was defeated in the Republican primary by Conservative Republican Richard E. Schermerhorn.

Dominick died on September 9, 2009, in Ponte Vedra Beach, St. Johns County, Florida; and was cremated.

Assemblyman DeWitt C. Dominick was his grandfather.

Sources

External links

1918 births
2009 deaths
Republican Party members of the New York State Assembly
Politicians from Newburgh, New York
Republican Party New York (state) state senators
Virginia Military Institute alumni
Columbia Law School alumni
20th-century American politicians
United States Army personnel of World War II
United States Army colonels